Otto of Lippe was a son of Bernhard II, Lord of Lippe. He was bishop of Utrecht as Otto II from 1216 to 1227. Several of his brothers also held high ecclesiastical offices in the Rhineland.

During the Fifth Crusade, Otto visited Palestine.

In 1227, Otto was joined by his former enemy, count Floris IV, Count of Holland, to suppress a rebellion by the people of Drenthe, led by Rudolph van Coevorden. He died in the Battle of Ane (a town close to Hardenberg) on 28 July 1227.

 
 

1228 deaths
Prince-Bishops of Utrecht
13th-century Roman Catholic bishops in the Holy Roman Empire
Christians of the Fifth Crusade
Military personnel killed in action
Year of birth unknown
House of Lippe
Sons of monarchs